Stephen Noel Elder  (born 29 September 1956) is an Australian former politician, who was the executive director of the Catholic Education Office Melbourne in Victoria, Australia from 2006 to 2018.

He represented the Liberal Party and was the member of the Legislative Assembly of the Parliament of Victoria for Ballarat North from August 1988 to October 1992. After the seat was abolished in a redistribution, he was elected Member for Ripon from October 1992 to August 1999, when he lost the seat in the rural landslide against the Kennett Government. Elder served as the Parliamentary Secretary for Education in the Victorian Government from 1992 to 1999.

He is also a member of the Senate of the Australian Catholic University; a member of the National Catholic Education Commission; a Director of Catholic Network Australia Ltd, the Board of Management of Church Resources and Mercy Health Foundation; a member of the Boards of the Catholic Development Fund and the Victorian Registration and Qualifications Authority and a Director and Company Secretary of Catholic Capital Grants (Vic) Ltd.

Prior to serving as a parliamentarian, Elder had been a teacher and community worker.

References

External links
 Catholic Education Office Melbourne - Director's Page

1956 births
Living people
Members of the Victorian Legislative Assembly
Liberal Party of Australia members of the Parliament of Victoria
Recipients of the Medal of the Order of Australia